Kostiantyn Yuriyovych Pestushko (February 14, 1898 – May 9, 1921) was a Ukrainian military leader, commander of the rebel , Otaman of the Kholodny Yar Republic.

Biography
Kostiantyn Yuriyovych Pestushko was born on February 14, 1898, in Hannivka, into a wealthy Ukrainian peasant family. Kostiantyn's grandfather, Semen Pavlovych Pestushko, was a well-to-do peasant, kept a zemstvo horse-post station and had a lot of land, part of which, 25 acres (and then a horse-post station), was transferred to Kostiantyn's father, Yurii Semenovych. The mother of the future ataman, Oleksandra, was illiterate, while his father graduated from four classes of the parish school. In the family, besides Kostiantyn, there were three more boys (Ivan, Fedir, Mykola) and three girls (Polina, Vira, Uliana). All of them graduated from school before 1917.

After studying at the rural primary two-year "ministerial" school, where he showed outstanding abilities in mathematics, Kostiantyn Pestushko entered the Oleksandrivsk secondary 7-grade mechanical and technical school (now the Zaporizhzhia National Technical University), the full course from which he graduated in 1916 - but for an unsatisfactory assessment of behavior in connection with a hooligan act against a mathematics teacher, he was not certified and in August 1916 he volunteered to fight in the First World War.

Military career
As a private, he fought in the Caucasus campaign, where he was injured. He was awarded two Crosses of St. George for bravery. After graduating from the school of warrant officers in Gori, he was sent to the Western Front. He rose to the rank of second lieutenant, and took command of a company. In the summer of 1917, he volunteered for the Death Shock Battalion, where the October Revolution found him. At the end of 1917, having barely escaped reprisals by the revolutionary Bolshevik soldiers, he returned to his homeland.

In 1918 he was mobilized into the army of the Ukrainian State. He served in Bila Tserkva, in the Mankovskyi regiment as an officer. After the anti-hetman Pavlo Skoropadskyi coup, from December 1918 – in the Ukrainian People's Republic army. In February-March 1919, the Ukrainian Soviet Army, advancing from the east, inflicted a crushing defeat on the Ukrainian People's Army: many units and formations of the UPA went over to the side of the enemy or self-demobilized. Pestushko left the service and returned to his native village. In June 1919, shortly after the Bolsheviks suppressed Nykyfor Hryhoriv's uprising, it was captured by the White Army.

Rebel Otaman
Fearing mobilization into the Volunteer Army, Kostiantyn Pestushko left for Oleksandrivsk to see his friends at the school. There, at the head of a small partisan detachment, he began military operations against the White Guards. To protect his family, he acted under the pseudonym "Stepovyi-Blakytnyi".

He acted as a member of the Makhnovist uprising against the military dictatorship of Anton Denikin. After he had increased the forces of the Middle Dnieper group to 3000 fighters, he renamed it to the Republican Forces and began to act independently.

After the Denikinites were expelled from Ukraine, in January 1920, Pestushko returned to his native village of Hannivka and was elected Chairman of the Volost Military Revolutionary Committee there, created by the Bolsheviks who had restored their power in Ukraine. He was in this position for about three months – until May 10, 1920. Over the course of the Bolsheviks' mobilization into the Red Army, he convinced the mobilized peasants of the Verkhnodniprovskyi district to unite in an insurgent detachment and act against the Reds in Kryvyi Rih. On May 12, after a seven-hour battle, Kryvyi Rih was liberated from the Bolsheviks.

In the spring and autumn of 1920, Kost Blakytnyi was one of the leaders of the anti-Bolshevik uprisings in Ukraine. He created and led the insurgent , which numbered from 12 to 18 thousand fighters and fought against the Bolshevik regime using partisan methods under the slogan "For the independence of Ukraine".

He acted in the Kherson, Katerynoslav and Kyiv provinces, in particular – in the Chyhyrynskyi district. He commanded the First Alexandrian Rebel Army. Although, in October 1920, having gone to the Yekaterinoslav province at the head of the Steppe Division, he resigned his position as Ataman.

In the fall of 1920, his insurgent movement covered the entire Kherson province and part of the Yekaterinoslav province. The activities of the Ekaterinoslavsky Insurgent Committee, headed by Pestushko, against the Bolsheviks were quite successful.

The Cheka developed a special operation to neutralize Kost Stepovoy. On April 29, 1921, the Cheka arrested more than 50 people involved in the rebel headquarters of Pestushko. Kostiantyn Yuriyovych Pestushko died on May 9, 1921, in Hannivka during a battle with a unit of the Kryvyi Rih security officers. He was buried in his native village.

Legacy
 In Kryvyi Rih, one of the streets is named after Pestushko.
 In August 2019 17th separate tank brigade of the Armed Forces of Ukraine was renamed after Pestushko by a decree of President Volodymyr Zelensky.

References

Bibliography

1898 births
1921 deaths
19th-century Ukrainian people
 Atamans
Russian military personnel of World War I
Ukrainian people of World War I
People of the Russian Civil War